The B4574 is a road linking the villages of Pont-rhyd-y-groes in Ceredigion, Wales, and Devil's Bridge,  east of Aberystwyth, and noted for three bridges built one above each other as well as for its falls and narrow gauge steam railway.

The road runs partly along a section of the upper Ystwyth valley, passing the remains of the Cwmystwyth Mines, a monumental arch built to commemorate George III's golden jubilee, and the Hafod Estate.

References

External links 

Transport in Powys
Transport in Ceredigion
Roads in Wales